EJO may refer to:

 European Journalism Observatory
 Koun Ejō (1198–1280), Sōtō Zen Buddhist patriarch